= Matti Kannas =

Finnish footballer (1928-2000)

Personal information
- Date of birth: 25 September 1928
- Date of death: 21 October 2000 (aged 72)

International career
Years	Team	Apps	(Gls)
1956–1959	Finland	9	(0)

Matti Kannas (25 September 1928 – 21 October 2000) was a Finnish footballer. He played in nine matches for the Finland national football team from 1955 to 1959.
